The 1972 Major League Baseball season was the first to have games cancelled by a player strike.  It was also the last season in which American League pitchers would hit for themselves on a regular basis; the designated hitter rule would go into effect the following season.

Labor strike and more moving
1972 was affected by a players' strike over pension and salary arbitration.  The strike erased the first week and a half of the season, cancelling 86 games, and the leagues decided to just excise the lost portion of the season with no makeups.  As a result, an uneven number of games were lost by each team; some as few as six, some as many as nine.  The lack of makeups, even when they affected the playoffs, led to the Boston Red Sox losing the American League East by half a game to the Detroit Tigers, who played one more game (156 to 155). 

1972 marked the first year for the Texas Rangers, who had moved to Arlington from Washington, D.C. (where they played as the Washington Senators) after the 1971 season.  The team was one of the worst ever fielded by the franchise, losing 100 games for the first time since 1964.  Manager Ted Williams hated it in the Dallas-Fort Worth area, and resigned at the end of the season.

To make room for the Rangers in the American League West Division, one of the teams already in that division would have to switch to the East Division. Technically, both the Chicago White Sox and the Milwaukee Brewers were the easternmost teams in the West Division, but only one of them could move, although the Minnesota Twins lobbied to keep the Rangers in the East because it wanted both the Brewers and White Sox as division rivals. It was decided that Milwaukee, as the newer franchise, would make the move, even though the White Sox wanted to go to the East since five of the league's original franchises were in that division, and that the Cubs were in the National League East. The Brewers would become division rivals of the Twins and White Sox in 1994 with the formation of the American League Central, but this would last only through 1997, when Milwaukee transferred to the National League and became a division rival of the Cubs (the Brewers and Twins continue to face each other every year through interleague play). 

1972 would mark the Kansas City Royals' final year at Kansas City Municipal Stadium, as the next year they would move to Royals Stadium at the Truman Sports Complex in eastern Kansas City. The Royals had hoped to move out of Municipal after the 1971 season, but a series of labor strikes forced the team to spend one more year at the old facility, which hosted the Athletics from 1955-67 (and the National Football League's Chiefs from 1963-71). 

Most teams (16 of 24) switched from wool flannel uniforms to double knit uniforms made of nylon and rayon at the outset of 1972. The Pirates were first to adopt double knits when they moved from Forbes Field to Three Rivers Stadium in July 1970. The Cardinals switched at the start of the 1971 season, and the Orioles gradually phased out their flannels throughout 1971, becoming all-double knit in time for the postseason.

The Giants wore flannels until midseason, going to double knits at home only; the flannels would not be phased out for the road uniforms until 1973. The Red Sox switched to double knits midway through 1972. Only the Royals, Expos and Yankees wore flannels full-time during the 1972 season, and all three converted to double knits for 1973 (the Royals waited to switch uniforms until their new stadium opened). 

The World Series was won by the Oakland Athletics, the first of three straight behind the bats of Reggie Jackson and Bert Campaneris, and the pitching cadre of Catfish Hunter, Rollie Fingers, and Vida Blue. Jackie Robinson, the first black player in modern MLB history, threw out the first pitch prior to Game 2 in what would be his last public appearance. He died two days after the series ended at age 53 due to complications from diabetes and heart failure.

The year ended on a sad note when Roberto Clemente died in an airplane crash off the coast of San Juan, Puerto Rico, on New Year's Eve, while participating in aid efforts after the 1972 Nicaragua earthquake.

Standings

American League

National League

Postseason

Bracket

Awards and honors
Baseball Hall of Fame
Yogi Berra
Josh Gibson
Lefty Gomez
Will Harridge
Sandy Koufax (at 36, the youngest inductee ever)
Buck Leonard
Early Wynn
Ross Youngs
Most Valuable Player
Dick Allen, Chicago White Sox, 1B (AL)
Johnny Bench, Cincinnati Reds, C (NL)
Cy Young Award
Gaylord Perry, Cleveland Indians (AL)
Steve Carlton, Philadelphia Phillies (NL)
Rookie of the Year
Carlton Fisk, Boston Red Sox, C (AL)
Jon Matlack, New York Mets, P (NL)
Gold Glove Award
George Scott (1B) (AL) 
Doug Griffin (2B) (AL) 
Brooks Robinson (3B) (AL) 
Ed Brinkman (SS) (AL) 
Paul Blair (OF) (AL) 
Bobby Murcer (OF) (AL) 
Ken Berry (OF) (AL)
Carlton Fisk (C) (AL) 
Jim Kaat (P) (AL)

Statistical leaders

1 National League Triple Crown Pitching Winner

Home Field Attendance

Events
January 13 – Bernice Gera wins a discrimination suit against organized baseball, opening the door for her to become the first female umpire in professional baseball.
January 19 – The Baseball Writers' Association of America elects Sandy Koufax, Yogi Berra and Early Wynn to the Baseball Hall of Fame. Koufax makes it in his first try and, at age of 36, is the youngest honoree in history.
February 8 – Commissioner Bowie Kuhn announces that the Special Committee on the Negro leagues has selected Josh Gibson and Buck Leonard for the Hall of Fame.
March 16 – Reigning American League Cy Young and MVP award winner Vida Blue announces his retirement.  It will be a short one as he will rejoin the Oakland Athletics in May.
April 1–13 – The first players' strike in baseball history wipes 6–8 games off the schedule of each MLB team. It is agreed that the missed games will be canceled altogether and not made up; this results in teams not being scheduled for the same number of games in the 1972 season. The schedule imbalance would lead to the Detroit Tigers edging the Boston Red Sox by only one-half game to win the American League East Division championship.  The strike results in the team owners adding salary arbitration to the collective bargaining agreement, and increasing pension fund payments.
April 2 – With the sudden death of Gil Hodges, Yogi Berra is named manager of the New York Mets.
April 16 – Chicago Cubs pitcher Burt Hooton pitches a 4–0 no-hitter over the Philadelphia Phillies at Chicago's Wrigley Field.
April 21 – At Arlington Stadium, Frank Howard hits the first home run in Texas Rangers history, a solo shot off Clyde Wright of the California Angels.
May 11 – The San Francisco Giants trade Willie Mays to the New York Mets for minor league pitcher Charlie Williams and cash.
May 14 – In front of a Mother's Day crowd of 35,000 in New York's Shea Stadium, Willie Mays makes a triumphant return to New York with the Mets, hitting a game-winning home run against his old teammates (the Giants). He scores in the first inning on Rusty Staub's grand slam and his solo homer in the fifth inning snaps a 4–4 tie. The final score: Mets 5, Giants 4.
May 28 – The Milwaukee Brewers fire manager Dave Bristol, replacing him with Del Crandall. Coach Roy McMillan takes over until Crandall arrives and guides the team to a 4–1 loss to the Boston Red Sox.
June 18 – The U.S. Supreme Court rules 5–3 in favor of Major League Baseball in the lawsuit (Flood v. Kuhn) brought by Curt Flood.
June 24 – In the first game of a doubleheader between the visiting Auburn Phillies and Geneva Senators of the Class A New York–Pennsylvania League, Bernice Gera becomes the first woman to umpire a professional baseball game.  She resigns between games after being verbally abused by some spectators and by some involved in the game.
July 2 – San Francisco's Willie McCovey hits his 14th career grand slam home run to pace the Giants' 9–3 win over the Los Angeles Dodgers. Pitcher Randy Moffitt wins his first major league game and receives a congratulatory telegram from his sister Billie Jean King, who is playing at Wimbledon.
July 4 – At Shea Stadium,  the Mets Tom Seaver has a no-hitter going into the 9th inning against the San Diego Padres when, with one out Leron Lee hits a clean single to center. The next batter, Nate Colbert, hits into a double play to end the game. The Mets win, 2-0.
July 11 – At Oakland, Boston's Marty Pattin has his no-hit bid foiled when Reggie Jackson hits a one-out single in the ninth inning. Boston wins 4–0.
July 14 – In a game between the Detroit Tigers and Kansas City Royals in Kansas City, the Tigers' catcher, Tom Haller, has his older brother Bill Haller right over his shoulder, the first time brothers have served as catcher and home plate umpire in the same Major League game. The Royals win 1–0.
July 18 – Against the Philadelphia Phillies at San Diego Stadium, San Diego Padre pitcher Steve Arlin has a no-hitter broken up with two out in the ninth by a Denny Doyle single. Doyle later advances to second on a balk, then scores on a Tommy Hutton single. Arlin comes away with a two-hitter (one of three he pitches on the season; he also hurls two one-hitters during a season in which he finishes 10–21) in a 5–1 Padre victory. It was the closest a Padre pitcher had come to a no-hitter until April 9, 2021, when Joe Musgrove no-hit the Texas Rangers in Arlington, Texas.
July 25 – At Atlanta Stadium, the National League wins the All-Star Game over the American League 4–3, behind hometown hero Hank Aaron's two-run home run and Joe Morgan's 10th-inning RBI single. Morgan is named MVP. It is the seventh time the Midsummer Classic has gone into extra innings.
August 29 – Jim Barr of the San Francisco Giants retires the first twenty batters in today's game.  Added to the last twenty one batters he retired in his previous game, it establishes a record for consecutive batters retired.  It will be tied in 2007 by Chicago White Sox relief pitcher Bobby Jenks.
September 2 – At Wrigley Field, Chicago Cub pitcher Milt Pappas no-hits the San Diego Padres 8–0. Pappas retires the first 26 batters and comes to within one strike of a perfect game with a 2–2 count to pinch-hitter Larry Stahl, but home-plate umpire Bruce Froemming calls the next two pitches, both of which are close, balls. Undeterred, Pappas ends the game by retiring the next batter, ex-Cub Garry Jestadt. This would be the last no-hitter the Cubs would be involved with until Carlos Zambrano would no-hit the Houston Astros on September 14, 2008. The perfect game bid is also the only one, to date, to be broken up on a walk to the 27th batter.
September 15 – Steve Carlton beats the Montreal Expos 5–3, raising his record to 24–9. The rest of the Philadelphia Phillies pitchers have a combined record of 26–80.
September 20 - The Atlanta Braves defeat the Houston Astros 13-6, with all 13 runs being scored in the second inning.
September 21 – The Pittsburgh Pirates clinch the National League East title with a 6–2 victory over the New York Mets.
September 22 – The Cincinnati Reds clinch the National League West crown with a 4–3 road victory over the Houston Astros.
September 30 – During the Pirates' 5–0 win over the Mets at Pittsburgh's Three Rivers Stadium, Roberto Clemente hits a double off New York's Jon Matlack in the fourth inning to get his 3,000th and final regular season hit in the major leagues.
October 2 – Montreal Expo pitcher Bill Stoneman no-hits the New York Mets 7–0 in the first game of a doubleheader at Jarry Park. The no-hitter is 1) the second of Stoneman's career (the first having come on April 17, 1969—only nine games into the Expos' existence), 2) the first no-hitter ever pitched in a regular season game in Canada, and 3) the latest, calendar-wise, that a regular-season no-hitter has been pitched, tied with Addie Joss' perfect game in 1908.
October 3 – The Detroit Tigers clinch the American League East as Woodie Fryman beats Luis Tiant of the Boston Red Sox 3–1 for his 10th win. Detroit's Chuck Seelbach picks up his 14th save and Al Kaline singles in the winning run for Detroit.
October 8 – In the seventh inning of Game 2 of the ALCS, Oakland Athletics shortstop Bert Campaneris is hit in the ankle by a pitch thrown by the Detroit Tigers' Lerrin LaGrow. An enraged Campaneris throws his bat at LaGrow, sparking a bench-clearing brawl in which Tiger manager Billy Martin has to be restrained from going after Campaneris. Both Campaneris and LaGrow are suspended for the rest of the series, with Campaneris being tagged with a fine as well. The Athletics win the game 6–0.
October 11 – The Pittsburgh Pirates carry a lead into the bottom of the ninth inning of the final game of the NLCS. However, the Reds' Johnny Bench homers to tie the game.  After some runners reach base, the Pirates' pitcher, Bob Moose, unleashes a wild pitch, permitting the pennant-clinching run to score. It proves to be Clemente's final game, as he died in a New Year's Eve plane crash. 
October 12 - The Oakland Athletics win their first pennant since 1931 by defeating the Detroit Tigers 2-1 in the decisive fifth game of the American League Championship Series. The victory proves costly when star outfielder Reggie Jackson tears a hamstring on a successful double steal which tied the game 1-1, knocking him out of the World Series. 
October 22 – The Oakland Athletics win the World Series with a 3–2 victory in Game 7 over the Cincinnati Reds. Gene Tenace, who had only five home runs in the regular season but hit four in the Series, is named MVP.
November 8 – The St. Louis Cardinals bring Tim McCarver back to the Gateway City, sending Jorge Roque to the Montreal Expos in exchange.
November 27 – The New York Yankees send catcher John Ellis, infielder Jerry Kenney, and outfielders Charlie Spikes and Rusty Torres to the Cleveland Indians in return for third baseman Graig Nettles and catcher Jerry Moses. It proves to be a great trade for the Yankees, as Nettles would become a stalwart on the Bronx Bombers' championship teams later in the decade.
December 10 – The American League votes unanimously to adopt the designated hitter rule on a three-year experimental basis. The DH will replace the pitcher in the lineup unless otherwise noted before the start of the game. In the December 1975 meeting, the AL will vote to permanently adopt the DH. The National League declines to follow suit, but is forced to adopt the DH by Commissioner Rob Manfred in 2020 (the DH in the NL was repealed in 2021 when the Commissioner's office and MLBPA do not come to an agreement prior to the season, but reinstated as part of the CBA between MLB and the MLBPA in 2022).

Births

January–March

January 9 – Jay Powell
January 13 – Akinori Otsuka
January 17 – Walt McKeel
January 18 – Mike Lieberthal
January 21 – Alan Benes
January 25 – José Macías
January 28 – Tsuyoshi Shinjo
January 29 – Morgan Burkhart
February 1 – Rich Becker
February 2 – Jared Fernandez
February 2 – Melvin Mora
February 11 – Brian Daubach
February 20 – Shane Spencer
February 22 – John Halama
February 23 – Rondell White
March 1 – Omar Daal
March 10 – Rob Stanifer
March 11 – Salomón Torres
March 22 – Cory Lidle
March 24 – José Cabrera
March 24 – Steve Karsay
March 27 – Adam Melhuse
March 29 – Alex Ochoa

April–June
April 11 – Robin Jennings
April 11 – Bobby M. Jones
April 11 – Jason Varitek
April 12 – Paul Lo Duca
April 14 – Roberto Mejía
April 16 – Antonio Alfonseca
April 17 – Gary Bennett
April 24 – Chipper Jones
April 26 – Brian Anderson
April 26 – Francisco Córdova
April 26 – Felipe Lira
May 1 – Bobby Chouinard
May 3 – Darren Dreifort
May 4 – Manny Aybar
May 10 – Marino Santana
May 19 – Scott McClain
May 24 – Danny Bautista
May 28 – Tilson Brito
May 30 – Scott Eyre
May 30 – Manny Ramírez
May 31 – Dave Roberts
June 2 – Raúl Ibañez
June 2 – Chance Sanford
June 3 – Bryan Rekar
June 6 – Tony Graffanino
June 6 – Brooks Kieschnick
June 13 – Darrell May
June 15 – Tony Clark
June 15 – Ramiro Mendoza
June 15 – Andy Pettitte
June 20 – Paul Bako
June 20 – Juan Castro
June 25 – Carlos Delgado
June 30 – Garret Anderson

July–September
July 6 – Greg Norton
July 11 – Mark Little
July 12 – Kelly Wunsch
July 15 – Wilson Delgado
July 24 – Shawn Wooten
August 5 – John Wasdin
August 7 – Kerry Lacy
August 15 – Chris Singleton
August 17 – Jeff Abbott
August 22 – Steve Kline
August 23 – Raul Casanova
August 28 – Jay Witasick
August 30 – José Herrera
September 7 – Jason Isringhausen
September 9 – Mike Hampton
September 9 – Félix Rodríguez
September 14 – David Bell
September 15 – Marc Newfield
September 21 – Scott Spiezio
September 30 – José Lima

October–December
October 5 – Aaron Guiel
October 6 – Valerio de los Santos
October 6 – Benji Gil
October 10 – Ramón Martínez
October 19 – Keith Foulke
October 19 – Joe McEwing
October 23 – Giomar Guevara
October 26 – Armando Almanza
October 27 – Brad Radke
November 3 – Armando Benítez
November 6 – Deivi Cruz
November 10 – Shawn Green
November 12 – Homer Bush
November 22 – Jay Payton
November 25 – Ramón Fermín
December 5 – Cliff Floyd
December 8 – Jolbert Cabrera
December 16 – Charles Gipson
December 21 – LaTroy Hawkins
December 21 – Dustin Hermanson
December 28 – Einar Díaz
December 29 – Jim Brower

Deaths

January–March
January 2 – Glenn Crawford, 58, outfielder for the St. Louis Cardinals and Philadelphia Phillies in the 1940s
January 21 – Dick Loftus, 70, outfielder for the Brooklyn Robins from 1924–25
February 9 – Chico Ruiz, 33, infielder for the Cincinnati Reds and California Angels
February 28 – Dizzy Trout, 56, All-Star pitcher for the Detroit Tigers who led the AL in wins in 1943 and was MVP runnerup the following year
March 11 – Zack Wheat, 83, Hall of Fame left fielder for the Brooklyn Dodgers who held team career records for games, hits, doubles and triples, a lifetime .317 hitter who retired with the 10th-most hits in history
March 16 – Pie Traynor, 73, Hall of Fame third baseman for the Pittsburgh Pirates who batted .320 lifetime and established a record for career games at third base; was named the best ever at his position in 1969
March 19 – Gordie Hinkle, 66, catcher for the 1934 Boston Red Sox
March 28 – Donie Bush, 84, shortstop of the Detroit Tigers for 14 seasons who led AL in walks five times and was a superlative bunter; later managed Pittsburgh to the 1927 NL pennant
March 30 – Davy Jones, 91, outfielder with the Detroit Tigers who organized a 1912 walkout to protest Ty Cobb's suspension for attacking a heckler

April–June
April 2 – Gil Hodges, 47, 8-time All-Star first baseman for the Brooklyn and Los Angeles Dodgers who drove in more runs than any other player during the 1950s and managed the "Miracle Mets" to the 1969 World Series title
April 3 – Alvin Crowder, 73, pitcher who had three 20-win seasons with the Browns and Senators, known for his mastery against the Yankees
May 15 – John Milligan, 68, pitcher who played from 1928 through 1934 for the Philadelphia Phillies and Washington Senators
May 20 – Hoge Workman, 72, pitcher for the 1924 Boston Red Sox, who also played and coached for Cleveland teams of the National Football League
May 22 – Dick Fowler, 51, Canadian pitcher who won 66 games with the Philadelphia Athletics, including a no-hitter
May 24 – Bill Moore, 68, catcher for the 1927 Boston Red Sox
May 29 – Moe Berg, 70, catcher who served as a spy for the U.S. government both during and after his playing career
June 9 – Del Bissonette, 72, first baseman who twice batted .300 for the Brooklyn Dodgers

July–September
July 31 – Rollie Hemsley, 65, All-Star catcher for seven teams, later a coach and minor league manager
August 13 – George Weiss, 77, executive who solidified the New York Yankees dynasty as the club's farm director and general manager from 1932 to 1960, then became the Mets' first team president
August 24 – J. Roy Stockton, 79, St. Louis sportswriter from the 1910s to the 1950s, also a sportscaster and author of books on baseball
September 2 – Jim Brillheart, 68, who pitched for the Senators, Cubs and Red Sox, and one of the few pitchers in baseball history to appear in over 1,000 games
August 29 – Clem Hausmann, 53, pitcher for the Boston Red Sox and Philadelphia Athletics between 1944 and 1949
September 6 – Charlie Berry, 69, American League catcher for eleven seasons, later an AL umpire from 1942 to 1962 who worked in five World Series and five All-Star Games; also played in the NFL and officiated numerous NFL Championship Games
September 16 – Eddie Waitkus, 53, All-Star first baseman who was shot in 1949 by a teenaged female admirer who lured him to her hotel room

October–December
October 9 – Dave Bancroft, 81, Hall of Fame shortstop for four NL teams, known for his defensive skill and also batting over .300 five times; captain of the New York Giants' pennant winners from 1921–1923
October 24 – Jackie Robinson, 53, Hall of Fame second baseman for the Brooklyn Dodgers who broke baseball's color line in 1947 after starring in the Negro leagues; he became the NL's 1949 MVP and batted .311 in a 10-year major league career
November 2 – Freddy Parent, 96, shortstop in the Red Sox' first seven seasons, and the last surviving participant of the inaugural 1903 World Series
November 26 – Wendell Smith, 58, sportswriter for Pittsburgh and Chicago newspapers since 1937 who became the BBWAA's first black member and helped ease Jackie Robinson's entry into the major leagues; also a Chicago sportscaster since 1964
December 20 – Gabby Hartnett, 72, Hall of Fame catcher for the Chicago Cubs who virtually clinched the 1938 pennant with a home run, he established career records for games and home runs as a catcher and was the NL's 1935 MVP
December 31 – Roberto Clemente, 38, right fielder for the Pittsburgh Pirates since 1955; a lifetime .317 hitter, 12-time All-Star and winner of 12 Gold Gloves who was a 4-time batting champion and the NL's 1966 MVP, he collected his 3000th base hit in September

References

External links
1972 Major League Baseball season schedule at Baseball Reference

 
Major League Baseball seasons